Apeirophobia (from ) is the phobia of infinity and/or eternity, causing discomfort and sometimes panic attacks. It normally starts in adolescence or earlier and it is currently not known how it normally develops over time. Apeirophobia may be caused by existential dread about eternal life or eternal oblivion following death. Due to this, it is often connected with thanatophobia (fear of dying).  Sufferers commonly report feelings of derealization which may cause the perception of a dreamlike or distorted reality. Existential OCD may sometimes be the cause of obsessive thoughts about infinity or eternity, which can lead to or trigger apeirophobia.

References

Phobias